The 2023 Superettan is part of the 2023 Swedish football season, and the 23rd season of Superettan, Sweden's second-tier football division in its current format. A total of 16 teams contest the league.

Teams
A total of 16 teams contest the league. The top two teams qualify directly for promotion to Allsvenskan, the third will enter a play-off for the chance of promotion. The two bottom teams are automatically relegated, while the 13th and 14th placed teams will compete in a play-off to determine whether they are relegated.

New teams
Promoted from the 2022 Ettan
Gefle IF - Winner Ettan Norra
GAIS - Winner Ettan Södra

Relegated from the 2022 Allsvenskan
Helsingborgs IF
GIF Sundsvall

Stadiums and locations

League table

Positions by round

Placement Progression

Results by round

Results

Season statistics

Top scorers

Top assists

Hat-tricks

Notes
4 Player scored 4 goals(H) – Home team(A) – Away team

Discipline

Player 
Most yellow cards:

Most red cards:

Club
 Most yellow cards: 

 Most red cards:

References

External links 

 Swedish Football Association – Superettan

Superettan seasons
Sweden
2023 in Swedish association football leagues

Copied content from 2022 Superettan; see that page's history for attribution